Eastbourne is a town in East Sussex, United Kingdom. It may also refer to:
 Eastbourne, County Durham, England
 Eastbourne, East Sussex, England
 Eastbourne (UK Parliament constituency)
 Eastbourne, New Zealand
 HMS Eastbourne, the name of two ships of the Royal Navy